The 2022 All-Ireland Senior Camogie Championship, known for sponsorship reasons as the Glen Dimplex Senior All-Ireland Championship, is the premier inter-county competition of the 2022 camogie season.

Teams

Twelve county teams compete in the Senior Championship. 22 lower-ranked county teams compete in the Intermediate and Junior Championships.

Format

Group stage

The twelve teams are drawn into two groups of six teams. The top three teams in each group advance to the knockout stages.

Knock-out stage

The second- and third-placed teams in each group play in the quarter-finals. The quarter-final winners play the two group winners in the semi-finals.

The bottom team in each group play off to decide the team relegated to the Intermediate Championship.

Group stage

Group 1

Group 2

Knock-out stage

Quarter-finals

Semi-finals

Final

Relegation playoff

Offaly are relegated to All-Ireland Intermediate Camogie Championship for 2023 season.

References

External links
 Camogie Association

2022 in camogie
2022